During the 1945–46 Scottish football season, Celtic competed in the Southern League First Division.

Results

Southern League Division A

Scottish Victory Cup

Southern League Cup

References

Celtic F.C. seasons
Celtic